Aniff Akinola is a British DJ and rapper from Manchester. He was born on September 1, 1962 in Manchester, United Kingdom.

Biography
He was a founding member of the cult Mancunian hip-hop group Chapter and the Verse and was a member of Backyard Dog whose song "Baddest Ruffest" made No. 15 on the UK Singles Chart which was used as Coca-Cola's 2002 FIFA World Cup theme in the UK and in the films Ali G Indahouse and Bend It Like Beckham.

On his own, his song "Bounce 'n' Boom" featuring Big Babba, recorded under the alias of Box Bottom, reached No. 46 on the UK  Singles Chart and has been featured in an advert for Vimto soft drinks.

In addition, he co-produced the Urban Cookie Collective hit "The Key the Secret" and the A Guy Called Gerald hit "Voodoo Ray", and rapped on the Kirsty MacColl hit "Walking Down Madison".

References

English male rappers
DJs from Manchester
Black British DJs
Black British male rappers
English people of Nigerian descent
English record producers
1962 births
Living people